Roepera morgsana is a succulent plant species in the genus Roepera. It is endemic to Namibia and the Cape Provinces of South Africa.

Distribution 
Roepera morgsana is found mostly in the Nama Karoo and Succulent Karoo biomes, but also in the Eastern Cape.

References

External links 
 

Endemic flora of South Africa
Flora of South Africa
Flora of Southern Africa
Flora of the Cape Provinces
Zygophylloideae